Lincoln Restaurant, or simply Lincoln, was a restaurant in Portland, Oregon. The menu included Pacific Northwest cuisine, seasonal small plates, and Italian pastas.

History
Jenn Louis and co-owner/spouse David Welch opened Lincoln in 2008. In 2013, the restaurant began hosting gnocchi tastings ahead of Louis' gnocchi cookbook. Cory Chunn served as sous chef at the time.

The restaurant closed in March 2017.

Reception
Portland Monthly says, "Lincoln soothes more than it struts, as evidenced by its straightforward, minimalist menu and sturdy fir tables. Louis eschews big flavors and gimmickry for freshness and balance. Her dishes are ingredient-driven and satisfying, perhaps a signature appetizer of two eggs baked with cream and chopped green olives, or a ribeye steak with braised leeks and a poached duck egg. The warehouse space has been remodeled, but nothing about this restaurant is new-fangled."

See also
 List of defunct restaurants of the United States
 List of Italian restaurants
 List of Pacific Northwest restaurants

References

External links

 Lincoln Restaurant at the Food Network

2008 establishments in Oregon
2017 disestablishments in Oregon
Boise, Portland, Oregon
Defunct Italian restaurants in Portland, Oregon
Defunct Pacific Northwest restaurants
Northeast Portland, Oregon
Restaurants disestablished in 2017
Restaurants established in 2008
Pacific Northwest restaurants in Oregon